The 2.6 Challenge is a response to the COVID-19 pandemic in the United Kingdom, designed to help replace lost income to the charitable sector. A particular concern was the cancellation of the London Marathon which raised over £60m in 2019. The marathon was  due to take place on 26 April, hence the challenge encourages people to do fundraising events based on the number 2.6.

The event was supported by the Charities Aid Foundation, the Institute of Fundraising, the Small Charities Coalition, the Office for Civil Society, Sport England, Sport Wales, Virgin Money Giving, Let's Do This and Just Giving. The challenge, which required participants to take part in events around the numbers 2 and 6, began on 26 April - the original date of the London Marathon. Organisers aimed to raise £67 million.

 it had raised £10.7 million.

See also
 Captain Tom

References

External links
 

COVID-19 pandemic in the United Kingdom
Charitable activities related to the COVID-19 pandemic
Charities based in the United Kingdom